Dauki Union is a union parishad situated at Alamdanga Upazila,  in Chuadanga District, Khulna Division of Bangladesh. There are 11 villages and 5 mouzas in the union.

References

External links
 

Unions of Khulna Division
Unions of Alamdanga Upazila
Unions of Chuadanga District